Aleksa Nenadović (1749 Brankovina, Valjevo, Serbia — 4 February 1804, Valjevo, Serbia) was ober knyaz of Tamnava—Posavina district of Valjevo nahiyah of the Belgrade Pashaluk.

Family 
Aleksa Nenadović was a member of the Nenadović family from Valjevo. His younger brother was Jakov Nenadović, the first Serbian Interior Minister and voivode (military commander) in the First Serbian Uprising. His sons were Sima Nenadović who was a Serbian voivode in the Second Serbian Uprising and Matija Nenadović, a Serbian archpriest, writer, and a notable leader of the First Serbian Uprising.

Biography 

Aleksa Nenadović had business relations with Hadži Mustafa Pasha who was a vizier of the Belgrade Pashaluk. He also cooperated with Peter Ichko who saved his life once. In the summer of 1797 sultan appointed Mustafa Pasha on position of beglerbeg of Rumelia Eyalet and he left Serbia for Plovdiv to fight against Pazvantoğlu. During the absence of Mustafa Pasha the forces of Pazvantoğlu together with Janissaries captured Požarevac and besieged Belgrade fortress. At the end of November 1797 Aleksa Nenadović together with other ober knezes from Valjevo Ilija Birčanin and Nikola Grbović brought their forces to Belgrade and forced besieging Janissary forces to retreat to Smederevo.

Death 

He was killed, decapitated, by forces of four Dahiyah during the event known as Slaughter of the Knezes. The event triggered a widespread revolt which eventually evolved into the First Serbian Uprising. According to contemporary sources from Valjevo, the severed heads of Aleksa Nenadović and Ilija Birčanin were put on some sort of a public display in the central square to serve as an example to those who might plot against the rule of the Dahia.

Citations

Sources
 

People of the First Serbian Uprising
19th-century Serbian people
Aleksa
Military personnel from Valjevo
1749 births
1804 deaths
18th-century Freikorps
Serbian murder victims
Murder victims from the Ottoman Empire
Serbs from the Ottoman Empire
Trophy heads
Deaths by decapitation